Yamaha 250 V4 (RD05A) is an air-cooled road racing motorcycle made by Yamaha, produced between 1967 and 1968, and competed until 1972.

References

250 V4
Grand Prix motorcycles